Banibash (Bänibaş) is a rural locality (a village) in Istyaksky Selsoviet, Yanaulsky District, Bashkortostan, Russia. The population was 150 as of 2010. There is 1 street.

Geography 
Banibash is located 10 km northeast of Yanaul (the district's administrative centre) by road. Istyak is the nearest rural locality.

References 

Rural localities in Yanaulsky District